Rasmus Nielsen may refer to:

 Rasmus Nielsen (footballer) (born 1987), Danish footballer
 Rasmus Nielsen (volleyballer) (born 1994), Danish volleyballer
 Rasmus Nielsen (ice hockey) (born 1990), Danish ice hockey player
 Rasmus Nielsen (squash player) (born 1983), Danish squash player
 Rasmus Nielsen (philosopher) (1809–1884), Danish philosopher and professor
 Rasmus Nielsen (biologist) (born 1970), professor of integrative biology at UC Berkeley
 Rasmus Kleis Nielsen, professor of political communication